Denville Hall is a historic building in Northwood, a town in the London Borough of Hillingdon, England, which is used as a retirement home for professional actors, actresses and members of other theatrical professions. The present building incorporates part of a 16th-century house, which was substantially rebuilt in 1851 and later considerably extended after becoming a retirement home in 1926. Many well-known British actors and actresses have resided there.

History and description

The hall includes part of a 16th-century house called Maze Farm. In the 18th century it belonged to the judge Sir John Vaughan. In 1851 it was rebuilt in Victorian Gothic style by Daniel Norton, and renamed Northwood Hall. Alfred Denville, impresario, actor-manager and MP, bought the hall in 1925 and dedicated it to the acting profession in memory of his son Jack, who had died at the age of 26 after onstage complications with re-aggravated World War I injuries. He renamed the building Denville Hall and created a charity in the same name. It was opened formally as a rest home in July 1926 by Princess Louise, the then Princess Royal.

The building, heavily extended in the intervening years, is locally listed. A further remodelling and expansion project with landscaping, by Acanthus LW Architects, was completed in 2004.

Simon Williams, who was co-chairman of Denville Hall for 15 years, incorporated some of his experiences in his play Laying the Ghost, basing Yew Tree House on the Hall.

Facilities and services

Though actors have priority, the home is available to other people in the entertainment industry (including the circus), such as agents and dancers, and their spouses over the age of 70 and offers residential, nursing, convalescent, dementia and palliative care. Residents can stay on a long-term or short-term basis, and physiotherapy is provided. There is also a subsidised bar.

Notable residents
Many British actors and actresses have spent their retirement years at Denville Hall, including: (Note: All actors and actresses listed here are deceased)

Nicholas Amer
Richard Attenborough
Gabrielle Blunt
Margot Boyd
Nan Braunton
Alan Brien
Tony Britton
Douglas Byng
Patsy Byrne
Peter Byrne
Kathleen Byron
Brian Cant
Pat Coombs
Brenda Cowling
Aimée Delamain
Maurice Denham
Leonard Fenton
Dulcie Gray
Peter Hall
Margaret Harris
Robert Hardy
Doris Hare
Rose Hill
John Horsley
Geoffrey Keen
Jo Kendall
Annette Kerr
Mark Kingston
David Lodge
Roger MacDougall
Elspeth March
Betty Marsden
Frank Middlemass
Jeanne Mockford
Peggy Mount
Daphne Oxenford
Muriel Pavlow
Richard Pearson
Arnold Ridley
Brian Rix
Paul Rogers
Clifford Rose
Andrew Sachs
Peter Sallis
Carmen Silvera
Gerald Sim
Sheila Sim, Lady Attenborough
Anthony Steel
Ronnie Stevens
Sylvia Syms
Malcolm Terris
Josephine Tewson
Geoffrey Toone
David Warner
Moray Watson
Elisabeth Welch
Billie Whitelaw
John Woodnutt
Edgar Wreford

Supporters

The hall and charity have had a number of notable supporters. Lord Attenborough, whose widow Sheila, Lady Attenborough, also resided at Denville Hall, was president.  In the late 1960s and early 1970s, performers including Sean Connery, Michael Caine, Paul Scofield and Elizabeth Taylor (for her television debut) donated their fees to rebuilding the house. In 1999 the original set from The Mousetrap, after 47 years' continuous use, was auctioned to raise money for Denville Hall. Restaurateur Elena Salvoni donated a portion of the profits of her 2007 autobiography, Eating Famously, to the hall. Terence Rattigan left his estate to charity, with all royalties from his plays being donated to Denville Hall and the King George V Fund for Actors and Actresses.

See also
 Brinsworth House – retirement home for entertainers

References

External links
 
 Postcard (1950s?) showing the hall
 1926 Pathe newsreel (silent) showing the hall being opened by Princess Louise

Houses completed in the 16th century
Buildings and structures completed in 1851
1925 establishments in England
Retirement communities
Retirement homes in the United Kingdom
Gothic Revival architecture in London
History of the London Borough of Hillingdon
Houses in the London Borough of Hillingdon
History of Middlesex